James Pickett may refer to:

James Pickett, musician in Cellador
Jamie Pickett, musician on The Voice (U.S. season 3)
James Chamberlayne Pickett (1793-1872), superintendent of the American Patent Office 
James Pickett (actor) in Three on a Meathook
James A. Pickett House on National Register of Historic Places listings in Shelby County, Kentucky